New Horizons was a radical right-wing populist political party in Cyprus founded in 1996. It aimed for a unitary state of Cyprus and rejected a federation of the Greek Cypriot and the Turkish part. In the legislative elections of 27 May 2001, the party won 3.0% of the popular vote and 1 of 56 seats. In 2005, it merged with Evropaiki Dimokratia to form Evropaiko Komma.

References 

Defunct political parties in Cyprus
Political parties disestablished in 2005
Right-wing populism in Asia
Right-wing populism in Cyprus